Matheus dos Santos Batista (born 16 June 1995) is a Brazilian footballer who plays for Caxias.

Club career
On 14 January 2022, he signed with Caxias.

References

1995 births
People from Americana, São Paulo
Footballers from São Paulo (state)
Living people
Brazilian footballers
Association football forwards
Grêmio Novorizontino players
Grêmio Foot-Ball Porto Alegrense players
C.D. Tondela players
Clube Atlético Tubarão players
Seinäjoen Jalkapallokerho players
Clube Náutico Marcílio Dias players
Clube Esportivo Bento Gonçalves players
Sociedade Esportiva e Recreativa Caxias do Sul players
Campeonato Brasileiro Série A players
Primeira Liga players
Campeonato Catarinense players
Veikkausliiga players
Kakkonen players
Campeonato Brasileiro Série D players
Brazilian expatriate footballers
Expatriate footballers in Portugal
Brazilian expatriate sportspeople in Portugal
Expatriate footballers in Finland
Brazilian expatriate sportspeople in Finland